Pastiera napoletana is a type of Neapolitan tart made with cooked wheat, eggs, ricotta cheese, and flavoured with orange flower water. It is usually eaten at Easter.

Legends
Various writers repeat legends about the origin of pastiera. One story connects it to the siren Parthenope, whom the Neapolitans thanked for her sweet singing by giving her ricotta, flour, eggs, milk, spices, and sugar; Parthenope gave these ingredients to the gods, who made pastiera out of it. Another story connects it to a spring celebration of the goddess Ceres.

Origins and tradition

The modern pastiera was probably invented in a Neapolitan convent. An unknown nun wanted that cake, symbol of the Resurrection, to have the perfume of the flowers of the orange trees which grew in the convent's gardens. She mixed a handful of wheat to the white ricotta cheese, then she added some eggs, symbol of the new life, some water which had the fragrance of the flowers of the spring time, candied citron and aromatic Asian spices.

We know for certain that the nuns of the ancient convent of San Gregorio Armeno were considered to be geniuses in the complex preparation of the Pastiera. They used to prepare a great quantity for the rich families during Easter time.

There are two different ways of preparing pastiera: in the older, the ricotta is mixed with the eggs or with the grain; in the newer, thick pastry cream is added, making the pastiera softer. This innovation was introduced by Starace, a Neapolitan confectioner with a shop in a corner in Piazza Municipio (Town hall square).

The pastiera has to be cooked some days in advance, no later than Maundy Thursday or Good Friday, in order to allow the fragrances to mix properly and result in that unique flavor. The Pastiera is not only cooked but also sold and served in appropriate pans called "ruoti" because it is very fragile, so it would easily crumble up if removed from the "ruoto".

The Savoury Variant
The savoury Neapolitan pastiera is a variant of the sweet one. The recipe differs from that of the sweet pastiera for the dough based on pre-cooked wheat and the filling obtained from the union of sausages and cheeses (the most typical are Neapolitan salami and caciocavallo). In some variants the use of brisé dough and puff pastry is preferred.

References

Sources

External links
 Traditional Italian Easter pie recipes, with video

Italian desserts
Italian cakes
Easter food
Neapolitan cuisine
Cuisine of Campania
Cheese dishes